Pierre-Henri de Valenciennes (December 6, 1750 – February 16, 1819) was a French painter who was influential in elevating the status of En plein air (open-air painting).

Life & work
Valenciennes worked in Rome from 1778 to 1782, where he made a number of landscape studies directly from nature, sometimes painting the same set of trees or house at different times of day. He theorized on this idea in his 1800 treatise Reflections and Advice to a Student on Painting, Particularly on Landscape, developing a concept of a "landscape portrait" in which the artist paints a landscape directly while looking upon it, taking care to capture its particular details.

Painting outside allowed Valenciennes to capture the fleeting changes of a landscape due to light and weather. He was a proponent of artists working outside and painting the same view at multiple times of day. Although he spoke of this as a type of painting mainly of interest to "amateurs", as distinguished from the higher art of the academies, he found it of great interest, and of his own works the surviving landscape portraits have been the most noted by later commentators.

He in particular urged artists to capture the distinctive details of a scene's architecture, dress, agriculture, and so on, in order to give the landscape a sense of belonging to a specific place; in this he probably influenced other French artists active in Italy who took an anthropological approach to painting rural areas and customs, such as Hubert Robert, Pierre-Athanase Chauvin and Achille-Etna Michallon.

Among his students were Jean-Victor Bertin, Achille Etna Michallon, Louis Étienne Watelet, Louis-François Lejeune and the first French panorama painter Pierre Prévost.

Born in the city of Toulouse, he died in Paris and is buried there in the Père Lachaise Cemetery.

Gallery

References

External links

18th-century French painters
French male painters
19th-century French painters
1750 births
1819 deaths
Burials at Père Lachaise Cemetery
19th-century French male artists
18th-century French male artists